The Kościan gas field in Poland was discovered in 1999. It began production in 2000 and produces natural gas. The total proven reserves of the Kościan gas field are around 371 billion cubic feet (10.5×109m³).

References

Natural gas fields in Poland